Samuel Ashe may refer to:

Samuel Ashe (North Carolina governor) (1725–1813), American politician, Governor of North Carolina
Samuel A'Court Ashe (1840–1938), American politician and Confederate soldier
Samuel Ashe (MP) (died 1708), English lawyer and politician